Robert Tappan Morris (born November 8, 1965) is an American computer scientist and entrepreneur. He is best known for creating the Morris worm in 1988, considered the first computer worm on the Internet.

Morris was prosecuted for releasing the worm, and became the first person convicted under the then-new Computer Fraud and Abuse Act (CFAA).
He went on to cofound the online store Viaweb, one of the first web applications, and later the venture capital funding firm Y Combinator, both with Paul Graham.

He later joined the faculty in the department of Electrical Engineering and Computer Science at the Massachusetts Institute of Technology (MIT), where he received tenure in 2006. He was elected to the National Academy of Engineering in 2019.

Early life 
Morris was born in 1965 to parents Robert Morris and Anne Farlow Morris. The senior Robert Morris was a computer scientist at Bell Labs, who helped design Multics and Unix; and later became the chief scientist at the National Computer Security Center, a division of the National Security Agency (NSA).

Morris grew up in the Millington section of Long Hill Township, New Jersey, and graduated from Delbarton School in 1983.

Morris attended Harvard University, and later went on to graduate school at Cornell University. During his first year there, he designed a computer worm (see below) that disrupted many computers on what was then a fledgling internet. This led to him being indicted a year later.

After serving his conviction term, he returned to Harvard to complete his Doctor of Philosophy (Ph.D.) under the supervision of H.T. Kung. He finished in 1999.

Morris worm 

Morris' computer worm was developed in 1988, while he was a graduate student at Cornell University. He released the worm from MIT, rather than from Cornell. The worm exploited several vulnerabilities to gain entry to targeted systems, including:
 A hole in the debug mode of the Unix sendmail program
 A buffer overflow or overrun hole in the fingerd network service
 The transitive trust enabled by people setting up network logins with no password requirements via remote execution (rexec) with Remote Shell (rsh), termed rexec/rsh

The worm was programmed to check each computer it found to determine if the infection was already present. However, Morris believed that some system administrators might try to defeat the worm by instructing the computer to report a false positive. To compensate for this possibility, Morris programmed the worm to copy itself anyway, 14% of the time, no matter what the response was to the infection-status interrogation.

This level of persistence was a design flaw: it created system loads that brought it to the attention of administrators, and disrupted the target computers. During the ensuing trial, it was estimated that the cost in "potential loss in productivity" caused by the worm and efforts to remove it from different systems ranged from $200 to $53,000.

Criminal prosecution 
In 1989, Morris was indicted for violating United States Code Title 18, the Computer Fraud and Abuse Act (CFAA). He was the first person to be indicted under this act. In December 1990, he was sentenced to three years of probation, 400 hours of community service, and a fine of $10,050 plus the costs of his supervision. He appealed, but the motion was rejected the following March. Morris' stated motive during the trial was "to demonstrate the inadequacies of current security measures on computer networks by exploiting the security defects [he] had discovered." He completed his sentence as of 1994.

Later life and work 
Morris' principal research interest is computer network architectures which includes work on distributed hash tables such as Chord and wireless mesh networks such as Roofnet.

He is a longtime friend and collaborator of Paul Graham. Along with cofounding two companies, Graham dedicated his book ANSI Common Lisp to Morris, and named the programming language that generates the online stores' web pages RTML (Robert T. Morris Language) in his honor. Graham lists Morris as one of his personal heroes, saying "he's never wrong."

Timeline 
1983 – Graduated from Delbarton School in Morristown, New Jersey
1987 – Received his Bachelor of Arts (B.A.) from Harvard University.
1988 – Released the Morris worm (when he was a graduate student at Cornell University)
1989 – Indicted under the Computer Fraud and Abuse Act (CFAA) of 1986 on July 26, 1989; the first person to be indicted under the Act
1990 – Convicted in United States v. Morris
1995 – Cofounded Viaweb, a start-up company that made software for building online stores (with Paul Graham)
1998 – Viaweb sold for $49 million to Yahoo, which renamed the software Yahoo! Store
1999 – Received Ph.D. in Applied Sciences from Harvard for thesis titled Scalable TCP Congestion Control
1999 – Appointed as an assistant professor at MIT
2005 – Cofounded Y Combinator, a seed-stage startup venture capital funding firm, that provides seed money, advice, and connections at two 3-month programs per year (with Paul Graham, Trevor Blackwell, and Jessica Livingston)
2006 – Awarded tenure at MIT
2006 – Technical advisor for Cisco Meraki
2008 – Released the programming language Arc, a Lisp dialect (with Paul Graham)
2010 – Awarded the 2010 Special Interest Group in Operating Systems (SIGOPS) Mark Weiser award
2015 – Elected a Fellow of Association for Computing Machinery (ACM, 2014) for "contributions to computer networking, distributed systems, and operating systems."
2019 – Elected to National Academy of Engineering

See also 
 List of convicted computer criminals

References

Further reading 

 
 A Report on the Internet Worm

External links 
 , at MIT

1965 births
Living people
American computer programmers
American computer scientists
Computer systems researchers
Cornell University alumni
Place of birth missing (living people)
Delbarton School alumni
MIT School of Engineering faculty
Computer security academics
American computer criminals
American technology company founders
People from Long Hill Township, New Jersey
Lisp (programming language) people
American computer businesspeople
Y Combinator people
Harvard School of Engineering and Applied Sciences alumni
People convicted of cybercrime
People charged with computer fraud